Sosnivka is a city in Chervonohrad Raion of Lviv Oblast (region) of Ukraine. It belongs to Chervonohrad urban hromada, one of the hromadas of Ukraine. Population: .

Until June 2019, Sosnivka was administratively subordinated to the city of Chervonohrad, and then transferred to Sokal Raion. The raion was abolished on 18 July 2020 as part of the administrative reform of Ukraine, which reduced the number of raions of Lviv Oblast to seven. The area of Sokal Raion was merged into Chervonohrad Raion.

References

Cities in Lviv Oblast
Chervonohrad
Cities of district significance in Ukraine
Populated places established in the Ukrainian Soviet Socialist Republic